Judge Thompson may refer to:

Albert C. Thompson (1842–1910), judge of the United States District Court for the Southern District of Ohio
Alvin W. Thompson (born 1953), judge of the United States District Court for the District of Connecticut
Anne Elise Thompson (born 1934), judge of the United States District Court for the District of New Jersey
Bruce Rutherford Thompson (1911–1992), judge of the United States District Court for the District of Nevada
David R. Thompson (1930–2011), judge of the United States Court of Appeals for the Ninth Circuit
Gordon Thompson Jr. (1929–2015), judge of the United States District Court for the Southern District of California
Joseph Whitaker Thompson (1861–1946), judge of the United States Court of Appeals for the Third Circuit
Myron H. Thompson (born 1947), judge of the United States District Court for the Middle District of Alabama
O. Rogeriee Thompson (born 1951), judge of the United States Court of Appeals for the First Circuit
Ralph Gordon Thompson (born 1934), judge of the United States District Court for the Western District of Oklahoma
Roby C. Thompson (1898–1960), judge of the United States District Court for the Western District of Virginia
Trina Thompson (born 1961), judge of the United States District Court for the Northern District of California

See also
R. Ewing Thomason (1879–1973), judge of the United States District Court for the Western District of Texas
Roszel Cathcart Thomsen (1900–1992), judge of the United States District Court for the District of Maryland
W. H. Seward Thomson (1856–1932), judge of the United States District Court for the Western District of Pennsylvania
Justice Thompson (disambiguation)